Auburn Township, Ohio, may refer to:

Auburn Township, Crawford County, Ohio
Auburn Township, Geauga County, Ohio
Auburn Township, Tuscarawas County, Ohio

Ohio township disambiguation pages